Mohamed Adam Rassil (born 3 February 1998) is a Tunisian basketball player for US Monastir and the Tunisian national team. With Tunisia, Rassil won a gold medal at the AfroBasket 2017 tournament.

Since the 2021–22 season, Rassil plays with US Monastir where he was on the roster for the 2022 BAL season, playing in two games. On 28 May 2022, he won the club's first-ever BAL championship with Monastir.

BAL career statistics

|-
|-
|style="text-align:left;background:#afe6ba;"|2022†
|style="text-align:left;"|Monastir
| 2 || 0 || 7.8 || .000 || .000 || .– || 3.0 || 0.5 || 0.0 || 0.5 || 0.0

References

1998 births
Living people
Tunisian men's basketball players
People from Nabeul
Forwards (basketball)
US Monastir basketball players
Étoile Sportive du Sahel basketball players
AS Hammamet players
21st-century Tunisian people